Timmy Dooley (born 13 February 1969) is an Irish Fianna Fáil politician who has served as a Senator since June 2020, after being nominated by the Taoiseach, and previously from 2002 to 2007 for the Administrative Panel. He served as a Teachta Dála (TD) for the Clare constituency from 2007 to 2020.

Early and personal life
Dooley was educated at Mountshannon National School and Scarriff Community College, and later at University College Dublin, where he was chairman of the Kevin Barry Cumann of Ógra Fianna Fáil in 1989. He is married to Emer McMahon and they have two daughters.

Political career
Dooley was first elected to the Dáil at the 2007 general election for the Clare constituency, after topping the poll with 10,791 votes.

He served as Opposition Spokesperson for Transport, Tourism and Sport from 2011 to 2016, and as Opposition Spokesperson for Communications, Climate Action and Environment from May 2016 to February 2020.

In January 2018, Dooley voiced his support for repealing the Eighth Amendment.

In 2019, he was involved in the Dáil voting scandal.

He lost his seat at the general election in February 2020. He was an unsuccessful candidate at the 2020 Seanad election, but was subsequently nominated by the Taoiseach, Micheál Martin to the Seanad in June 2020.

References

External links
Timmy Dooley's page on the Fianna Fáil website

 

1969 births
Living people
Alumni of University College Dublin
Fianna Fáil senators
Fianna Fáil TDs
Members of the 22nd Seanad
Members of the 30th Dáil
Members of the 31st Dáil
Members of the 32nd Dáil
Politicians from County Clare
Members of the 26th Seanad
Nominated members of Seanad Éireann